L'Équipe (French for "the team") is a French nationwide daily newspaper devoted to sport, owned by Éditions Philippe Amaury. The paper is noted for coverage of association football, rugby, motorsport, and cycling. Its predecessor was L'Auto, a general sports paper whose name reflected not any narrow interest but the excitement of the time in car racing.

L'Auto originated the Tour de France road cycling stage race in 1903 as a circulation booster. The race leader's yellow jersey was instituted in 1919, probably to reflect the distinctive yellow newsprint on which L'Auto was published. The competition that would eventually become the UEFA Champions League was also the brainchild of a L'Équipe journalist, Gabriel Hanot.

History

L'Auto-Vélo

L'Auto and therefore L'Équipe owed its life to a 19th-century French scandal involving soldier Alfred Dreyfus – the Dreyfus affair. With overtones of antisemitism and post-war paranoia, Dreyfus was accused of selling secrets to France's old enemy, the Germans.

As different sides of society insisted he was guilty or innocent – he was eventually cleared but only after rigged trials had banished him to an island prison camp – the split came close to civil war and still has its echoes in modern French society.

France's largest sports paper, Le Vélo, mixed sports coverage with political comment. Its editor, Pierre Giffard, believed Dreyfus innocent and said so, leading to acrid disagreement with his main advertisers. Among them were the automobile-maker the Comte de Dion and the industrialists Adolphe Clément and Édouard Michelin.

Frustrated at Giffard's politics, they planned a rival paper. The editor was a prominent racing cyclist, Henri Desgrange, who had published a book of cycling tactics and training and was working as a publicity writer for Clément. Desgrange was a strong character but lacked confidence, so much doubting the Tour de France founded in his name that he stayed away from the pioneering race in 1903 until it looked like being a success.

L'Auto

Three years after the foundation of L'Auto-Vélo in 1900, a court in Paris decided that the title was too close to its main competitor, Giffard's Le Vélo. Thus reference to 'Vélo' was dropped and the new paper became simply L'Auto. It was printed on yellow paper because Giffard used green.

Circulation was sluggish, however, and only a crisis meeting called "to nail Giffard's beak shut", as Desgrange phrased it, came to its rescue. Then, on the first floor of the paper's offices in the rue du Faubourg-Montmartre in Paris, a 26-year-old cycling and rugby writer called Géo Lefèvre suggested a race round France, bigger than any other paper could rival and akin to six-day races on the track.

The Tour de France proved a success for the newspaper; circulation leapt from 25,000 before the 1903 Tour to 65,000 after it; in 1908 the race boosted circulation past a quarter of a million, and during the 1923 Tour it was selling 500,000 copies a day. The record circulation claimed by Desgrange was 854,000, achieved during the 1933 Tour.

Desgrange died in 1940 and ownership passed to a consortium of Germans. The paper began printing comments favourable to the occupying Nazis and so its doors were nailed shut with the return of peace, like all other papers that had printed under the Germans.

L'Équipe

In 1940 Jacques Goddet (1905–2000) succeeded Desgrange as editor and nominal organiser of the Tour de France (although he refused German requests to run it during the war, see Tour de France during the Second World War). Jacques Goddet was the son of L'Auto'''s first financial director, Victor Goddet. Goddet defended his paper's role in a court case brought by the French government but was never wholly cleared in the public mind of being close to the Germans or to the Head of the French State, Philippe Pétain (1856–1951).

Goddet could point, however, to clandestine printing of Resistance newspapers and pamphlets in the L'Auto print room and so was allowed to publish a successor paper called L'Équipe. It occupied premises across the road from where L'Auto had been, in a building that had actually been owned by L'Auto, although the original paper's assets had been sequestrated by the state. One condition of publication imposed by the state was that L'Équipe was to use white paper rather than yellow, which was too closely attached to L'Auto.

The new paper published three times a week from 28 February 1946. Since 1948 it has been published daily. The paper benefited from the demise of its competitors, L'Élan, and Le Sport. Its coverage of car racing hints at the paper's ancestry by printing the words L'Auto at the head of the page in the gothic print used in the main title of the prewar paper.L'Équipe is published in tabloid format.

Émilien Amaury

In 1968 L'Équipe was bought by Émilien Amaury (1909–1977), founder of the Amaury publishing empire. Among L'Équipe's most respected writers have been Pierre Chany (1922–1996), Antoine Blondin (1922–1991) and Gabriel Hanot (1899–1968).

Philippe Amaury – Éditions Philippe Amaury

The death of Émilien Amaury in 1977 led to a six-year legal battle over inheritance between his son and daughter. This was eventually settled amicably with Philippe Amaury owning the dailies while his sister owned magazines such as Marie-France and Point de Vue. Philippe then founded Éditions Philippe Amaury (EPA), which included L'Équipe,  Le Parisien and Aujourd'hui. At Philippe's death in 2006, the group passed to his widow, Marie-Odile, and their children.

Evolutionary milestones

 In 1980 L'Équipe began publishing a magazine with its Saturday edition.
 On 31 August 1998, L'Équipe TV was formed.
 In 2005 a Sports et Style supplement was added to the Saturday edition.
 In 2006 L'Équipe Féminine was first published.
 In 2006 L'Équipe bought the monthly, Le Journal du Golf.
 In early 2007 L'Équipe supplemented its main website with L'équipe junior, dedicated to youth.

Circulation in France

The biggest-selling issue was that of 13 July 1998, the day after the France national football team won the World Cup. It sold 1,645,907 copies. The second best was published on 3 July 2000, after France won the European Football Championship and the paper sold 1,255,633 copies.

In 2020, the circulation of L'Equipe was 219,032 copies.

Directors
 1946–1984: Jacques Goddet
 1984–1993: Jean-Pierre Courcol
 1993–2002: Paul Roussel
 2003–2008: Christophe Chenut
 2008–present: François Morinière

Editors
 1946–1954: Marcel Oger
 1954–1970: Gaston Meyer
 1970–1980: Édouard Seidler
 1980–1987: Robert Parienté
 1987–1989: Henri Garcia
 1989–1990: Noel Couëdel
 1990–1992: Gérard Ernault
 1993–2003: Jérôme Bureau
 2003–: Claude Droussent and Michel Dalloni

See also
 L'Équipe Champion of Champions
 France Football''

References

External links

 Official website 

1946 establishments in France
Daily newspapers published in France
Newspapers established in 1946
Sports newspapers published in France
Tour de France mass media
French news websites